Qalai Naeem is a village in eastern Afghanistan. It is the district center of Char Asiab District, Kabul Province.

See also 
Kabul Province

Populated places in Kabul Province